Kim Yong-su may refer to
Kim Yong-soo (born 1960), South Korean baseball player
Kim Yong-su (footballer) (born 1979), North Korean association football midfielder
Kim Yong-su (politician), North Korean politician
Kim Yong-su (weightlifter) (born 1965), North Korean weightlifter